The Maintenance and Embracery Act 1540 (32 Hen 8 c 9) was an Act of the Parliament of England.

Any offence under this Act, to the extent to which it depended on any provision of this Act, was abolished for England and Wales on 21 July 1967. This Act was repealed for England and Wales on 21 July 1967.

This Act was retained for the Republic of Ireland by section 2(2)(a) of and Part 2 of Schedule 1 to, the Statute Law Revision Act 2007.

Section 3
The purpose of this section was to introduce, as an alternative to criminal prosecution, a common informer action for certain forms of interference with the course of justice in legal proceedings that were concerned with the title to land.

The words "or suborne any witnes by Ires, rewardis, promises, or by any other sinistre labour or meanes," and the words "or to the procurement or occasion of any manner of pjury by false verdict or otherwise" were repealed by section 17 of, and the Schedule to, the Perjury Act 1911.

The words from "the Sterre Chamber" to "marches of the same", except the words "or elliswhere within England", were repealed, and the words "of dett bill playnte" were repealed, by section 1 of, and Schedule 1 to, the Statute Law Revision Act 1948.

The institution of proceedings under this section was restricted by sections 1 and 3 of, and the Schedule to, the Common Informers Act 1951.

In 1966, the Law Commission recommended that this section be repealed. They said that there was no sense in having a special rule for actions concerned with land.

Section 6
The words "of dett bill playnte" were repealed by section 1 of, and Schedule 1 to, the Statute Law Revision Act 1948.

References
Halsbury's Statutes,

External links
List of amendments in the Republic of Ireland from the Irish Statute Book.

Acts of the Parliament of England (1485–1603)
1540 in England
1540 in law